The northern clingfish (Gobiesox maeandricus) is a species of saltwater fish. It is a member of the family Gobiesocidae of order Gobiesociformes. It is native to the Pacific coast of North America from Revillagigedo Island and Baja California north to southeastern Alaska. It is commonly found in the intertidal zone clinging to the underside of rocks by small hairs akin to those on a gecko's feet on the basal portions of the pelvic and pectoral fins. This species was described by Charles Frédéric Girard in 1858 from specimens collected at San Luis Obispo in California, Girard had originally named it as Lepadogaster reticulatus in 1854 but this name was preoccupied by Lepadogaster reticulatus Risso, 1810.

References
 Seashore Life of the Northern Pacific Coast an Illustrated Guide to Northern California, Oregon, Washington, and British Columbia, by Eugene N. Kozloff 

Northern clingfish
Fish described in 1858